Miller's snail, scientific name Cochliopina milleri, is a species of very small freshwater snails that have an operculum, aquatic gastropod mollusks in the family Hydrobiidae, the mud snails. This species is endemic to Mexico.

References

Cochliopina
Gastropods described in 1966
Taxonomy articles created by Polbot
Endemic molluscs of Mexico